Khaled Mohamed El Nabawy (born September 12, 1966) is an Egyptian actor who played roles in film, theater and television.

He was born in Mansoura, Egypt, and was introduced to cinema by the director Youssef Chahine in 1994, in his film Al Mohager. El Nabawy was awarded the All African Film Award for best actor for his role in this film, and also won the Horus Award for best supporting actor for Al Maseer, from Cairo National Festival for Egyptian Cinema. El Nabawy attended the Institute of Performing Arts. He lives in Cairo, Egypt. His roles in Hollywood include Mullah, the first advisor to Saladin, portrayed by Ghassan Massoud in the blockbuster film Kingdom of Heaven. He also played the role of Hamed, an Iraqi scientist in the film Fair Game.

El Nabawy was a high profile supporter of the 2011 Egyptian revolution both in the media and also, at times, personally protesting the streets.

Filmography

Television

Theatre

References

External links

1966 births
Living people
20th-century Egyptian male actors
Egyptian male film actors
People from Mansoura, Egypt
Egyptian male stage actors
Egyptian male television actors
21st-century Egyptian male actors